Auckland International College is an independent coeducational secondary school in Auckland, New Zealand. It adopts the IB Diploma Programme as its sole curriculum plus a Preparation Year Programme for the course (Year 11). The school runs with a Northern Hemisphere timetable, as the school year commences in July, and students sit their final IB examinations in May. AIC also offers a six-month course running from January to June for international students whose English is not at a high enough level to embark on the Year 11 Preparation Year Programme. The AIC English Course for Senior Secondary Studies covers all curriculum subjects, developing and improving English language skills required for further study in a New Zealand classroom.

History

July 2003: AIC is established with the funding of the Oshu Corporation Japan; Carolyn Solomon is appointed as principal.	
January 2006: Craig Monaghan takes over as principal of AIC; Carolyn Solomon moves into the role of Executive Principal.	
December 2006: Craig Monaghan resigns as principal; Roger Lewis is acting principal from January to April 2007.
April 2007: Anne Willmann is appointed as AIC's new principal.	
June 2009: Mike Parry is appointed as AIC's new principal
2009: Agnes Chan is appointed as AIC's president.
2011: Construction is started at new building for school in Blockhouse Bay and for boarding house in Avondale.
January 2012: School was moved into new building in Blockhouse Bay and New Zealand Prime Minister John Key is invited as chief guest for official opening
April 2013: Carolyn Solomon is appointed again as principal
July 2017: Mike Parry is appointed again as principal
October 29th 2021: Due to the COVID-19 pandemic, Principal Michael Parry announced that the school will be permanently closed in June 2023, 20 years after its foundation.

Curriculum
International Baccalaureate:
 Year 11: Pre IB Programme
 Year 12 and 13: IB Diploma Programme

References

External links
 AIC School Website
 IBO School Page

Secondary schools in Auckland
International Baccalaureate schools in New Zealand
Boarding schools in New Zealand
Educational institutions established in 2003
2003 establishments in New Zealand
Schools in West Auckland, New Zealand